Lincoln School District may refer to:
 Lincoln Consolidated School District (Arkansas) (formerly just "Lincoln School District")
 Lincoln Unified School District, California
 Lincoln Unified School District 298, Kansas
 Lincoln Consolidated School District (Michigan)
 Lincoln Public Schools, Nebraska
 Lincoln County School District (disambiguation)